Tales for All is a series of children and family films produced by the company Les Productions la Fête. These films were also published as books.

List of titles
The films are also referred as Tales for All #1, Tales for All #2, etc.

DVD Box Sets
In December 2005, Rock Demers announced that films from the Contes Pour Tous series would be released in DVD box sets in Canada through Imavision. These box sets include many new special features, but a great deal were disappointed by the sets when released because the films have no English audio or subtitle options.

Coffret Collection 1
Coffret Collection 1 (Box Set #1) was bundled with a bonus CD of ten songs from the films, only available through Imavision's website. Released September 26, 2006 - UPC 
 La guerre des tuques
 Fierro... l'été des secrets
 Régina
 C'est pas parce qu'on est petit qu'on peut pas être grand!
 Bach et Bottine
 Mon petit diable

Coffret Collection 2
Box Set #2, released April 10, 2007 - UPC 
 La grenouille et la baleine
 Bye Bye, Chaperon Rouge
 Danger Pleine Lune
 Vincent et moi
 La Championne
 Le Jeune Magicien

Coffret Collection 3
Coffret Collection 3 (Box Set #3) includes a set of books to correspond with the DVDs. Released August 21, 2007 - UPC 
 Le martien de Noël
 Opération beurre de pinotes
 Les aventuriers du timbre perdu
 Le retour des aventuriers du timbre perdu
 Pas de répit pour Mélanie
 Tirelire combines & cie

Coffret Collection 4
Box Set #4, released March 16, 2010 - UPC 
 Viens danser... sur la lune
 La forteresse suspendue
 Un cargo pour l'Afrique
 Maman, mon éléphant et moi
 Hathi
 Moustaches

External links
 Official site (English)
 Official site (French)
 Productions La Fête Film Production Company
 Attraction Distribution Official Distributor

Quebec films
 Tales
Canadian film series